Jeremy Page Rockliff (born 5 February 1970) is an Australian politician who has been serving as the 47th Premier of Tasmania since April 2022, after the resignation of Peter Gutwein as Premier. He has been a Liberal Party member of the Tasmanian House of Assembly in the Division of Braddon since the 2002 election. He was the Deputy Premier of Tasmania from 2014 to 2022 before becoming Premier.

Early life and education
Rockliff was born on 5 February 1970 in Devonport, Tasmania. He is the son of Richard and Geraldine Rockliff, with his father's family having farmed at Sassafras since the 1850s.

Rockliff grew up on his family's farm at Sassafras. He attended Latrobe High School and Launceston Church Grammar School. He completed a diploma in farm management at Lincoln University in New Zealand, before returning to Sassafras to manage the family property. He was president of the Latrobe Football Club from 2006 to 2009.

Political career
Rockliff joined the Young Liberal Movement in 1991, and the Liberal Party in 1992. He became MP for Braddon in the House of Assembly in 2002. He was immediately promoted to the front bench, serving as opposition whip from 2002 until March 2006. When Will Hodgman, who had also been first elected in 2002, was elected leader of The Tasmanian Liberal Party in March 2006, he named Rockliff as his deputy, and hence Deputy Leader of the Opposition.

Rockliff became Deputy Premier of Tasmania in March 2014, following the Liberal Party winning government at the 2014 state election. He also served as Minister for Education and Training, and Minister for Primary Industries and Water. When Hodgman resigned as party leader and Premier in January 2020, Rockcliff did not stand in the subsequent Liberal Party leadership contest, which was won by Peter Gutwein unopposed on 20 January 2020. As such, Rockcliff remained as deputy party leader and Deputy Premier.

Along with being Deputy Premier, Rockliff was also Minister for Education and Training, Minister for Trade, Minister for Advanced Manufacturing and Defence Industries, Minister for Disability Services and Community Development, and Minister for Mental Health and Wellbeing.

At a party-room meeting on the morning 8 April 2022, Rockliff was elected unopposed as the new leader of the Tasmanian Liberal Party, after Peter Gutwein had announced his resignation earlier that week. That afternoon he was sworn in by the Governor as the 47th Premier of Tasmania.

As Premier, Rockcliff has continued the state government's negotiations with the Australian Football League (AFL) in an attempt to gain a 19th team licence for Tasmania. Rockcliff has championed a proposed $240 Million multi-use stadium to be built in Hobart's Macquarie Point as a part of this bid. He has faced criticism for his steadfast support of a stadium from the Tasmanian Labor Party and The Tasmanian Greens as well as some in the federal Liberal Party

References

External links
Personal Website

1970 births
Living people
Members of the Tasmanian House of Assembly
Liberal Party of Australia members of the Parliament of Tasmania
Deputy Premiers of Tasmania
Premiers of Tasmania
Lincoln University (New Zealand) alumni
21st-century Australian politicians